Claude Arabo (3 October 1937 – 2 July 2013) was a French fencer. He won a silver medal in the individual sabre event at the 1964 Summer Olympics.

References

External links
 

1937 births
2013 deaths
French male sabre fencers
Olympic fencers of France
Fencers at the 1960 Summer Olympics
Fencers at the 1964 Summer Olympics
Fencers at the 1968 Summer Olympics
Olympic silver medalists for France
Olympic medalists in fencing
Medalists at the 1964 Summer Olympics